Stictane pectinata is a moth in the family Erebidae. It was described by Jeremy Daniel Holloway in 2001. It is found on Borneo. Its habitat consists of lower montane forests.

The length of the forewings is about 5 mm.

References

Moths described in 2001
Nudariina